Adam Azim is a British professional boxer.

Personal life
Azim was born in Slough, Berkshire, England. His family roots lie in the city of Kotli in Pakistan's Azad Kashmir and his father is a boxing trainer while his elder brother Hassan Azim is also a professional boxer.

Professional career

Early career
Before turning pro Azim won ten national titles and was ranked the world’s No.1 youth amateur at welterweight.

Azim made his professional debut on 2 December 2020 against Ed Harrison. Azim won via wide points decision after winning every round on the referees scorecard. On 20 November 2021, Azim fought against Stu Greener. Towards the end of the opening round, Azim knocked his opponent down after landing a right hook. In the opening moments of the second round, Azim knocked Greener onto the canvas for a second time with another right hook. Following the second knockdown, the referee called an end to the bout.

Azim faced Jordan Ellison on 19 February 2022. In the opening round, Azim connected with a powerful right hand to the body which knocked his opponent down onto the canvas. Azim continued to control the bout and in the third round, he landed a heavy hand which knocked his opponent down for a second time. Following the second knockdown, the referee waved off the bout. On 26 March 2022, Azim fought Connor Marsden. Twelve seconds into the bout, Azim knocked his opponent down with a jab. Moments later, Azim dropped Marsden for a second time, after which the bout was called to an end.

Azim's fifth bout as a professional was against Anthony Loffet on 25 June 2022. Azim dropped his opponent with a right hook in the opening exchanges of the first round. Loffett was able to beat the count, however, Azim proceeded to connect with a number of right hooks which visibly hurt his opponent. Following this, Loffett's corner opted to throw in the towel to protect their fighter from further damage. On 3 September 2022, Azim faced Michel Cabral. In the opening round, Azim landed a powerful left hook to the body which visibly hurt his opponent. Azim followed this up with two heavy punches to the head which knocked Cabral onto the canvas. The bout was called to an end after Cabral was unable to beat the count.

Professional boxing record

References

External links

Living people
Year of birth missing (living people)
People from Slough
Light-welterweight boxers
English male boxers
British sportspeople of Pakistani descent
British people of Pakistani descent
English people of Pakistani descent
People from Kotli District